Juan Lacaze, or Juan L. Lacaze, is a city located in southwestern Uruguay, within the Colonia Department.

Geography

Juan Lacaze has coasts over the Río de la Plata basin.

History
On 15 March 1920, the populated area situated at the "Puerto del Sauce" was declared as "Pueblo" (village) by the Act of Ley Nº 3.433. On 17 August 1920 its status was elevated to "Villa" (town) by the Act of Ley Nº 7.257 and finally elevated to "Ciudad" (city) on 8 May 1953 by the Act of Ley Nº 11.934.

Population 
According to the 2011 census, Juan Lacaze had a population of 12,816.
 
Source: Instituto Nacional de Estadística de Uruguay

Places of worship
 St. Joseph the Worker and St. John Bosco (Roman Catholic, Salesians of Don Bosco)

Government 
The city mayor (alcalde) as of November 2020 is Arturo Bentancor.

Sports 
Deportivo Colonia has its headquarters in Juan Lacaze.

Notable people 
 José Carbajal, musician. 
 Javier Chevantón, footballer.
 Osvaldo Laport, actor.
 Cristian Rodríguez, footballer.
 Obdulio Trasante, footballer.
 Fernando Troche, guitarist.
 Julio Rodríguez, footballer.

References

External links 
 Juan Lacaze's official website 
 Information about the city at www.guiacolonia.com.uy 
INE map of Juan Lacaze and Arrivillaga
 Juan Lacaze's News 

Populated places in the Colonia Department
Populated coastal places in Uruguay